The Burdette School Complex is a collection of historic school buildings at 153 East Park Lane in Burdette, Arkansas.  It consists of six buildings, five of which were built between 1922 and 1948.  The oldest is a stuccoed Prairie Style structure with a hip roof.  Also of note is a red brick building built in 1939 with funding from the Works Progress Administration, and the gymnasium, which consists of three Quonset huts with a false front.  The complex is regionally distinctive in that none of its buildings have been significantly altered or removed.

The complex was listed on the National Register of Historic Places in 2001.

See also
National Register of Historic Places listings in Mississippi County, Arkansas

References

School buildings on the National Register of Historic Places in Arkansas
Tudor Revival architecture in Arkansas
Prairie School architecture in Arkansas
School buildings completed in 1922
Education in Mississippi County, Arkansas
Historic districts on the National Register of Historic Places in Arkansas
National Register of Historic Places in Mississippi County, Arkansas
1922 establishments in Arkansas
Works Progress Administration in Arkansas